San Juan de la Costa is a commune of Chile, located in the Osorno Province in the Los Lagos Region. The administration (municipalidad) is located at the hamlet of Puaucho, 34 km west of Osorno. San Juan de la Costa is known for its large population of indigenous Huilliches. This commune is characterized by a large coastline suitable for ecotourism, especially balnearios Pucatrihue and Maicolpue, the port of Bahía Mansa, and the ethnic tourism of the Huilliche culture.

Demographics
Of these, 902 (10.2%) lived in urban areas and 7,929 (89.8%) in rural areas. The population fell by 9.7% (947 persons) between the 1992 and 2002 censuses.

Administration
As a commune, San Juan de la Costa is a third-level administrative division of Chile administered by a municipal council, headed by an alcalde who is directly elected every four years. The 2008-2012 alcalde is Javier Oyarzo Ruiz (RN).

Within the electoral divisions of Chile, San Juan de la Costa is represented in the Chamber of Deputies by Javier Hernández (UDI) and Sergio Ojeda (PDC) as part of the 55th electoral district, together with Osorno and San Pablo. The commune is represented in the Senate by Camilo Escalona Medina (PS) and Carlos Kuschel Silva (RN) as part of the 17th senatorial constituency (17).

References

External links
  Municipality of San Juan de la Costa

Communes of Chile
1979 establishments in Chile